Meicheng is a town in Minqing County in northwestern Fuzhou Municipality, Fujian Province, in the People's Republic of China.

History
Fire from the soldiers at Meicheng (then romanized "Min-tsing" from its role as the seat of Minqing County) turned back an expedition by Karl Gützlaff and Edwin Stevens to explore and evangelize in Fujian's tea country in 1835.

See also
 List of township-level divisions of Fujian

References

Towns in Fujian
Minqing County